Ogallah is an unincorporated community in Trego County, Kansas, United States.  As of the 2020 census, the population of the community and nearby areas was 28.  It is located approximately 7 miles east of WaKeeney.

History
Ogallah was named for the Oglala Lakota tribe.

The post office was established January 27, 1879.

Geography

Climate
The climate in this area is characterized by hot, humid summers and generally mild to cool winters.  According to the Köppen Climate Classification system, Ogallah has a humid subtropical climate, abbreviated "Cfa" on climate maps.

Demographics

For statistical purposes, the United States Census Bureau has defined Ogallah as a census-designated place (CDP).

See also
 Cedar Bluff Reservoir and Cedar Bluff State Park

References

Further reading

External links
 Trego County maps: Current, Historic, KDOT

Unincorporated communities in Trego County, Kansas
Unincorporated communities in Kansas